Zoie Kennedy (born in 1977 in Weobley, Herefordshire, England) is an English television and theatre actress. Her first known TV appearance was as a WPC in This Is Personal: The Hunt for the Yorkshire Ripper. Shortly after this followed the role of news reporter Polly Grantham in Emmerdale and Staff Nurse Meryl Taylor in ITV's The Royal from 2002–2006.  After The Royal she played pregnant Claudia Wheeler in Holby City. Kennedy now lives in London with her composer husband, Desmond O'Connor, and their two children. She is Artistic Director of the multi-award-winning Twice Shy Theatre and an International storyteller, co founding The Shadow Travellers with Eleanor Buchan. She is also a community choir leader, writer, director and puppeteer alongside her acting and voiceover work.

References

Born 20.January 1977

External links

 Zoie Kennedy Official website
 The Shadow Travellers
 Zoie Sings
 Twice Shy Theatre

Living people
1977 births
People from Weobley
English television actresses
People educated at Haberdashers' Monmouth School for Girls